Andrea Montanari (born 10 August 1965) is a retired Italian sprinter who specialized in the 400 metres. He won one medal, at senior level, at the International athletics competitions.

Biography
He finished fourth in the 4x400 m relay at the 1990 European Championships, with teammates Vito Petrella, Roberto Ribaud and Andrea Nuti. His personal best time is 46.16 seconds, achieved in August 1993 in Bologna. He has 14 caps in national team from 1987 to 1993.

National titles
Andrea Montanari has won one time the individual national championship.
1 win in the 400 metres (1989)

See also
 Italy national relay team

References

External links
 

1965 births
Living people
Sportspeople from Ravenna
Italian male sprinters
Mediterranean Games gold medalists for Italy
Athletes (track and field) at the 1987 Mediterranean Games
World Athletics Championships athletes for Italy
Mediterranean Games medalists in athletics
Italian Athletics Championships winners
20th-century Italian people